Palaeobates is an extinct genus of prehistoric elasmobranch sharks in the order Hybodontiformes. It lived during the Triassic period. Palaeobates had a grinding-type dentition, which it used to crush hard-shelled prey. The teeth exhibit an orthodont histology.

See also
 List of prehistoric cartilaginous fish

References

Hybodontiformes
Prehistoric shark genera